Several different indigenous clans lived in the island of Sri Lanka during the pre-Vijaya era (before 505 BCE). These clans of Sri Lanka and the mystical kingdom of Lanka were mentioned in the great epics of Mahavamsa, Vargapurnika, Mahabaratha, Manimekalai, Ramayana and Sangams.

See also
 Yaksha Kingdom
 Rakshasa Kingdom
 Naga people (Lanka)
 Dewa (people)
 Vedda people
 Lanka
 Kuveni

References

Pre Anuradhapura period